And or AND may refer to:

Logic, grammar, and computing
 Conjunction (grammar), connecting two words, phrases, or clauses
 Logical conjunction in mathematical logic, notated as "∧", "⋅", "&", or simple juxtaposition
 Bitwise AND, a boolean operation in programming, typically notated as "and" or "&"
 Short-circuit and, a short-circuit operator, notated "&&", "and", "and then", etc.
 Ampersand, the symbol "&", representing "and"
 AND gate, in electronics

Music albums
 And (John Martyn album), 1996
 And (Koda Kumi album), 2018
 A N D, a 2015 album by Tricot
 And, a 2007 album by Jonah Matranga

Businesses and organizations
 Alberta New Democrats, now Alberta New Democratic Party
Academy of Nutrition and Dietetics, US
 Automotive Navigation Data, digital map supplier
 AND Corporation, biometrics
 AND CO, software subsidiary of Fiverr

Transportation
 Anderson Regional Airport, South Carolina, US, IATA airport code
 Anderston railway station, Scotland, National Rail codeh

Other uses
 Allow natural death, a medical term
 Andorra, ISO 3166-1 alpha-3 country code
 Andromeda (constellation), abbreviation
 Ansus language, ISO 639-3 code

See also

 & (disambiguation)
 Ampersand (disambiguation)